Asaphodes cataphracta is a moth in the family Geometridae. It is endemic to New Zealand and is found in the South Island. This species prefers grassy or tussock covered mountain side slopes as habitat. The adults of this species are on the wing from December until March. The larvae of A. cataphracta is known to consume native mountain buttercups (Ranunculaceae).

Taxonomy
This species was first described by Edward Meyrick in 1883 as Larentia cataphracta using specimens collected at Arthur's Pass at 3,000 feet, Lake Guyon, and Lake Wakatipu at 4,000 feet. Meyrick gave a fuller description of the species later in 1884. George Hudson discussed the species in his 1898 volume New Zealand moths and butterflies and referred to it as Xanthorhoe cataphracta. In 1971 J. S. Dugdale placed this species in the genus Asaphodes. This placement was reaffirmed by Dugdale in 1988. The female lectotype, collected at Arthur's Pass, is held at the Natural History Museum, London.

Description 

Hudson described the species as follows:

Distribution and habitat 

A. cataphracta is endemic to New Zealand and can be found in the South Island. It prefers grassy mountain side slopes as habitat. Specimens of this species have been collected in the North Canterbury (NC) and Westland (WD) specimen collection localities as described by Crosby et al. The species was collected in February in the Mount Cook district by Alfred Philpott as well as at Arthur's Pass to Lake Wakatipu up to 1200m by Meyrick. Hudson stated the species occurred in abundance in the Humboldt mountains. Specimens were also collected in tussock country near the Homer saddle by George Howes.

Behaviour 
The adults of this species are on the wing from December until March.

Host species 
The larvae of this species is known to consume native mountain buttercups (Ranunculaceae).

References

Moths described in 1883
Moths of New Zealand
Larentiinae
Endemic fauna of New Zealand
Taxa named by Edward Meyrick
Endemic moths of New Zealand